Events from the year 1984 in Taiwan, Republic of China. This year is numbered Minguo 73 according to the official Republic of China calendar.

Incumbents
 President – Chiang Ching-kuo
 Vice President – Hsieh Tung-min, Lee Teng-hui
 Premier – Sun Yun-suan, Yu Kuo-hwa
 Vice Premier – Chiu Chuang-huan, Lin Yang-kang

Events

January
 1 January – The establishment of Kenting National Park in Pingtung County.

April
 23 April – The first Han Kuang Exercise.

June
 1 June – The founding of Compal Electronics.

July
 27 July – The commissioning of first unit of Maanshan Nuclear Power Plant in Pingtung County.

Births
 16 January – Bea Hayden, actress and model
 11 February – Huang Cheng-wei, baseball player
 1 April – Wang Seng-wei, baseball player
 4 June – Rainie Yang, singer, actress and TV host
 7 August – Hsu Wei-ning, actress and model
 8 August – Amanda Chou, actress
 24 August – Kimi Hsia, actress and TV host
 5 September – Mandy Wei, actress, model and host
 6 September – Tseng Shu-o, football player
 2 September – Danson Tang, actor and singer
 22 September – Godfrey Gao, model and actor
 28 September – Tsai Ming-chin, baseball player
 21 October – Pets Tseng, actress, singer and television host
 21 November – Sphinx Ting, actor and model
 9 December – Hu Yingzhen, actress, model and host
 20 December – Lala Hsu, singer and songwriter

References

 
Years of the 20th century in Taiwan